Dr Daya Shankar Mishra known as Dayalu is an Indian politician from Ghazipur (Varanasi) and a Minister of State in Second Yogi Adityanath ministry. He hails from Varanasi. He had fought 2007 and 2012 elections from Varanasi South over Indian National Congress symbol.

References 

Living people
Year of birth missing (living people)
Yogi ministry
Bharatiya Janata Party politicians from Uttar Pradesh
Indian National Congress politicians from Uttar Pradesh